Forspoken is a 2023 action role-playing game developed by Luminous Productions and published by Square Enix. It was released on January 24, 2023, on PlayStation 5 and Windows. The game received mixed reviews from critics.

Gameplay

According to director Takeshi Aramaki, the gameplay was designed to be focused on terrain traversal speed and fluidity. Square Enix also described the game as a "narrative-driven adventure". The character exists in an open world game format where players are able to travel anywhere at any time. 

The player character, Frey, has access to a variety of magical spells. Following each combat encounter, the player earns experience points. Frey's cloak can be upgraded in order to improve her combat efficiency and stats, while applying nail polish unlocks special abilities. The player can also craft new items, or rest at a safe location in order to restore health. While the player is exploring the game world, they may encounter a "breakstorm", a scenario similar to a horde mode in which waves of demonic creatures spawn and attack Frey. The storm ends with the appearance of a named boss character.

Synopsis

Setting and characters
The protagonist, Alfre "Frey" Holland (Ella Balinska) is a young woman who is transported from New York City to the fantasy world of Athia. She uses magical powers to journey through it and survive in order to find her way home. Athia is under the tyrannical rule of the Tantas, which include Tanta Sila (Janina Gavankar), Tanta Prav (Pollyanna McIntosh), Tanta Olas (Claudia Black) and Tanta Cinta (Kendal Rae).  Other characters include Frey's sentient bracelet Cuff (Jonathan Cake), the archivist Johedy (Keala Settle), and Auden (Monica Barbaro).

Plot
Frey, a young woman who was abandoned near the Holland Tunnel as a newborn, appears in court for theft and is sentenced to community service. She is ambushed by the gang she stole from, but escapes to her accommodation and her cat, Homer. The gang sets the building ablaze, but Frey and Homer escape. Now homeless, Frey trusts Homer to her sentencing judge, and visits Holland Tunnel on her birthday. She is drawn to a mysterious bangle, which activates a portal that draws her in.

Frey is transported to the world of Athia as the portal disappears. The bangle, bonded to her arm, reveals that it is sentient and can only be heard by her. Frey names him "Cuff" and finds that he has awakened latent magical abilities within her. She discovers Athia is overrun by a mysterious miasma called the Break, which corrupts all life, but she is unaffected by it. Frey reaches the city of Cipol that acts as humanity's refuge from the Break. Its ruling council captures Frey, both supporting and distrusting her resistance to the Break. They compromise by imprisoning Frey, but a citizen named Auden helps her escape to the slums.

Frey learns that Athia was once ruled by the Tantas, four benevolent sorceresses, but they began exuding the Break and oppressing the city's inhabitants. Auden tells Frey that her father, Robian, researched the Break, but was lost in it twenty years ago. Frey flees the city and locates Robian, who has suffered partial insanity. They return to Cipol to find Tanta Sila terrorizing the populace in search of Frey. Frey repels Sila, but fails to prevent the death of civilians. Frey leaves to confront Sila at her domain and mortally wounds her in battle; as she dies, Frey absorbs her powers.

Frey receives a hero's welcome at Cipol, but the Break engulfs much of the city. Archivist Johedy explains that the Break's surge was the result of Sila's death; only by killing the remaining Tantas' can it be eradicated. A traumatized Frey refuses and determines to use Robian to return to Earth, but his mental state has rapidly deteriorated. While Frey searches for a medicinal sap, Cuff persuades her to negotiate with Tanta Prav. Frey surrenders to Prav and is put on trial for the murder of Sila. Despite Frey passing a trial by water, she is attacked by Prav. Frey defeats her and as she dies, Prav claims that Tanta Cinta is Frey's mother. At Cipol, Frey finds Robian near death. Having worked under Cinta, he confirms that Frey is her daughter before dying. Frey resolves to confront Cinta, but as she leaves, a light consumes her.

Frey wakes up on Earth in an idealized version of her former life with no memory of Athia. Several of her Athian friends are shown living nearby, including Cinta, whom Frey enjoys a relationship with. Cuff contacts Frey, which restores her memories. She discovers Tanta Olas created the illusion and escapes, appearing near the Tanta's castle; inside, she finds Olas dead. Cuff takes a humanoid form and identifies himself as Susurrus, an ancient demon awakened by the Rheddig, who the Tantas waged war against; he was using Frey to steal the Tantas' powers. Frey attempts to flee when Cinta arrives and sends her through another portal to safety.

Frey appears in Svargana, the final resting place for all Tantas, and meets the now-sane Sila, Prav, and Olas. They tell Frey how the Rheddig sent Susurrus to oppress Athia. Though the Tantas defeated him, he split into four and bonded to them in the form of bangles, causing their insanity. Frey reunites with Cinta, who reveals that years prior, Robian discovered the portal and Cinta used it to travel to New York, where she became pregnant; the other Tantas then sealed the baby's powers away. After fighting Susurrus, Cinta staved off madness before giving birth to Frey. Fearing she would attempt to harm her child, Cinta sent her to Earth, but the piece of Susurrus sealed to Cinta followed Frey. In the present, Frey's powers return to her and Cinta offers Frey a choice: return to New York, or stay and battle Susurrus.
 If Frey returns to Earth, she retrieves Homer and contemplates her uncertain future.
 If Frey remains in Athia, she and Cinta confront Susurrus, during which Cinta is killed. Frey uses the powers of the Tantas to defeat Susurrus, imprisoning him in his cuff form, which bonds to her. A memorial is held in Cipol for the deceased. In a mid-credits scene, Frey imagines telling Homer about her experiences and promises to come back for her. In the postgame, Frey—now a Tanta—and her allies begin rebuilding Cipol and clearing the Break from Athia.

Development
Forspoken is the debut project for Luminous Productions; the company was originally assembled from employees working on Final Fantasy XV. Earlier in development, the game was known under the title Project Athia. It was developed to take advantage of the graphical capabilities of the PlayStation 5 and will also release for Windows. Technologies featured in the game include ray tracing for greatly enhanced lighting effects, and procedural generation for the creation of large-scale locations. Initially set to be released on May 24, 2022, Square Enix delayed its release to October 11, 2022, and then to January 24, 2023.

The game's writing team includes Gary Whitta, Amy Hennig, Allison Rymer, and Todd Stashwick. The team approached Brandon Sanderson for the project, but he declined the offer as he was working on another video game project (later revealed to be Moonbreaker) at that time. Bear McCreary and Garry Schyman composed music for the game. The game is a PlayStation 5 console exclusive, alongside the PC version, for two years. 

A month after the game's release, Square Enix announced that Luminous Productions would be absorbed back into Square Enix in May 2023 to "further bolster the competitive prowess of the Group's development studios". Luminous Productions said that they would remain committed to Forspoken in the meantime, with patch updates and releasing downloadable content.

Reception

Critical response

Forspoken received "mixed or average" reviews, according to review aggregator Metacritic.

The Verge praised the game's parkour system, saying it made the game's otherwise empty world "enthralling" to traverse, although they felt the combat was "one-note" and "kinda useless" in comparison. Polygon criticized Forspoken's slow start and noted that the game ended by the time it had presented the player with a full range of abilities. The game's dialogue received criticism from players for being "cringey", and became the subject of internet memes.

Sales

The PlayStation 5 version of Forspoken was the third bestselling retail game during its first week of release in Japan, with 29,055 physical copies being sold across the country.

In February 2023, during a financial results briefing, Square Enix president Yosuke Matsuda said sales of the game had been "lacklustre", attributing this to the game's "challenging" reviews.

References

External links 
 

2023 video games
Action role-playing video games
Fantasy video games
Japanese role-playing video games
Open-world video games
PlayStation 5 games
Portal fantasy
Single-player video games
Square Enix games
Video games developed in Japan
Video games featuring black protagonists
Video games featuring female protagonists
Video games with alternate endings
Windows games